Barrie Vagg (born 21 January 1943) is a former Australian rules footballer who played with Melbourne in the Victorian Football League (VFL) during the 1960s.

Vagg was recruited by Footscray in 1960 but failed to get a senior game and left at the end of the season. A half forward, he joined Melbourne for the 1962 season and was a member of their 1964 premiership team. He topped Melbourne's goal kicking in 1965 with 30 goals and again the following year with 20 goals.

References

External links

1943 births
Australian rules footballers from Victoria (Australia)
Melbourne Football Club players
Shepparton Football Club players
Living people
Melbourne Football Club Premiership players
One-time VFL/AFL Premiership players